Colorado district courts are the state trial courts of general jurisdiction in the U.S. state of Colorado.

They have original jurisdiction in civil cases with any amount in controversy; felony criminal cases, domestic relations, family law, and cases involving minors cases (including adoption, dependency, juvenile delinquency, and paternity actions), probate, and mental health cases.

The Colorado district courts are established by the Colorado Constitution, Article VI (Judicial Department), Sections 9-12. This part of the state constitution provides that "The district courts shall be trial courts of record with general jurisdiction, and shall have original jurisdiction in all civil, probate, and criminal cases, except as otherwise provided herein, and shall have such appellate jurisdiction as may be prescribed by law." The constitution also provides for a unique probate court in the consolidated city–county of Denver, which has exclusive jurisdiction in matters of probate and administration of estates. 

Appeals from the district court go to the intermediate appellate court, the Colorado Court of Appeals, and in some cases go directly to Colorado Supreme Court, which is the state supreme court.

The lower Colorado county courts, which are courts of limited jurisdiction, handle civil cases under $15,000. Decisions from the county courts may be appealed to the district courts. Unlike a common practice where appeals are reviewed by a panel of at least three judges, the Colorado district courts act in dual capacity (i.e. as trial courts and as appellate courts), thus each appeal is decided by a single judge. Per C.R.S. 13-6-310(4) further appeal cannot be reviewed by the Court of Appeals, and is only upon writ of certiorari issued in the discretion of Colorado Supreme Court.

There are 22 judicial circuits, each encompassing one or more of Colorado's 64 counties. Five judicial circuits have only one county within its jurisdiction, while one circuit has seven small counties in its jurisdiction:

1st Judicial District - Gilpin, Jefferson
2nd Judicial District - Denver
3rd Judicial District - Huerfano, Las Animas
4th Judicial District - El Paso, Teller
5th Judicial District - Clear Creek, Eagle, Lake, Summit
6th Judicial District - Archuleta, La Plata, San Juan
7th Judicial District - Delta, Gunnison, Hinsdale, Montrose, Ouray, San Miguel
8th Judicial District - Jackson, Larimer
9th Judicial District - Garfield, Pitkin, Rio Blanco
10th Judicial District - Pueblo
11th Judicial District - Chaffee, Custer, Fremont, Park
12th Judicial District - Alamosa, Conejos, Costilla, Mineral, Rio Grande, Saguache
13th Judicial District - Kit Carson, Logan, Morgan, Phillips, Sedgwick, Washington, Yuma
14th Judicial District - Grand, Moffat, Routt
15th Judicial District - Baca, Cheyenne, Kiowa, Prowers
16th Judicial District - Bent, Crowley, Otero
17th Judicial District - Adams, Broomfield
18th Judicial District - Arapahoe, Douglas, Elbert, Lincoln
19th Judicial District - Weld
20th Judicial District - Boulder
21st Judicial District - Mesa
22nd Judicial District - Dolores, Montezuma

See also

 Judiciary of Colorado
 Government of Colorado
 Law of Colorado
Same-sex marriage in Colorado

References

External links
Official website

Colorado state courts
Courts and tribunals with year of establishment missing